This is a list of children's classic books published no later than 2008 and still available in the English language.

Books specifically for children existed by the 17th century. Before that, books were written mainly for adults – although some later became popular with children. In Europe, Gutenberg's invention of the printing press around 1440 made possible mass production of books, though the first printed books were quite expensive and remained so for a long time.  Gradually, however, improvements in printing technology lowered the costs of publishing and made books more affordable to the working classes, who were also likely to buy smaller and cheaper broadsides, chapbooks, pamphlets, tracts, and early newspapers, all of which were widely available before 1800. In the 19th century, improvements in paper production, as well as the invention of cast-iron, steam-powered printing presses, enabled book publishing on a very large scale, and made books of all kinds affordable by all.

Scholarship on children's literature includes professional organizations, dedicated publications, and university courses.

Before 18th century

18th century

19th century

20th century

21st century

See also

 List of American children's books
 List of children's literature authors
 List of fairy tales

References

Further reading

 A scholarly examination of canons of children's literature.
 Includes a basic reading list on pp. xi–xvi.